People's Unity Party can refer to:
People's Unity Party (Finland)
People's Unity Party (Gabon)
People's Unity Party (Papua New Guinea)
People's Unity Party (Tajikistan)
People's Unity Party (Tunisia)
People's Unity Party – Socialist Party, a defunct political party in Iceland